Toby Hession (born 6 February 1997) is an English composer, conductor, and pianist.

Early life and studies 
Hession was born in Peterborough. Between 2010 and 2015 he attended Chetham's School of Music, Manchester, studying piano with Masayuki Tayama, with whom he continues to study, and composition with Gavin Wayte. He read music at Clare College, Cambridge and graduated in 2018, having held a choral scholarship and an instrumental award there.

Compositions 
Hession has written works which have been performed in numerous venues (amongst them Westminster Abbey, King's College, Cambridge, Peterborough Cathedral, etc.) by such ensembles as the Choir of Clare College, Cambridge, Aurora Orchestra, the Manchester Camerata, the Commonwealth Festival Orchestra and Inner Voices.

Hession's recent works include a commission by The King's Singers and a set of canticles premièred by the Choir of Clare College, Cambridge in 2018. His works have been broadcast on Classic FM and Radio 3 and are published by Edition Peters.

Conductor 
Hession has conducted a wide range of ensembles in venues such as West Road Concert Hall, Cambridge, Westminster Abbey, Bridgewater Hall and Manchester Cathedral.

In January 2018, Hession conducted the UK premiere of Iván Fischer's Eine Deutsch-Jiddische Kantate in Clare College Chapel.

Pianist 
Hession has given performances across the UK, at venues including West Road Concert Hall, Cambridge, St. Martin in the Fields, St. James's Piccadilly, London, the Royal Northern College of Music and Peterborough Cathedral. He has performed Grieg's Piano Concerto and Beethoven's Fifth Piano Concerto ('Emperor') with the Cambridge University Music Society (CUMS) orchestra and the East Anglia Chamber Orchestra respectively.

References

External links 
 Official website of Toby Hession
 Toby Hession on encoremusicians

1997 births
21st-century classical musicians
21st-century English musicians
English composers
English conductors (music)
English pianists
Living people
People from Peterborough
21st-century British conductors (music)
21st-century pianists